The West Pleasant Street Historic District is a nationally recognized historic district located in Maquoketa, Iowa, United States. It was listed on the National Register of Historic Places in 1991.  At the time of its nomination it contained 50 resources, which included 29 contributing buildings, 21 non-contributing buildings, and one non-contributing site.  The historic district is primarily a residential area that was built during Maquoketa's "Boom Years" (1873-1899) and the "Comfortable Years" (1900-1922).  The first house built in the district was in 1863 and the last was in 1914.  This is where many of the city's business and professional leaders choose to build their houses.  Most of the 28 houses were probably not designed by an architect, but were crafted in the "High Style" of the time by local builders. With the exception of Greek Revival, all the major styles of the period built in Maquoketa are found here.  Eight of the houses and one of the three remaining carriage houses are brick structures; the rest are wood.

The Maquoketa Public Library at the east entrance of the district is only non-residential contributing building.  The J.E. Squiers House at the west entrance of the district is individually listed on the National Register, as is the library.  The non-contributing site is a surface parking lot.

References

Historic districts on the National Register of Historic Places in Iowa
National Register of Historic Places in Jackson County, Iowa
Historic districts in Jackson County, Iowa
Buildings and structures in Maquoketa, Iowa
Victorian architecture in Iowa